Albert Ernest Thomas Barrow (1 March 1908, Allahabad — 7 March 1990) was an Indian politician and nominated Anglo-Indian member of the Lok Sabha from 1951 to 1971 and again from 1977 to 1989. He studied at the Colvin School and Boys' High School, Allahabad and later at Chelmsford Training College at Ghora Gali of Murree Hills and at University of Dublin, Trinity College, Ireland.

Was married to  Doris Muriel Walker (1906–1989), a school teacher. Has one son, Trevor Albert Charles Barrow (born 1935).

References

1908 births
India MPs 1952–1957
India MPs 1957–1962
India MPs 1962–1967
India MPs 1967–1970
India MPs 1977–1979
India MPs 1980–1984
India MPs 1984–1989
Nominated members of the Lok Sabha
Politicians from Allahabad
1990 deaths
Indian National Congress politicians from Uttar Pradesh